Lobo Bravo Rugby is a nonprofit civil association which has, as main goal, spread the rugby practice in central and southern Paraná, especially in the city of Guarapuava, its headquarters.

History
Thanks to the transmission of the Rugby World Cup, on 20 October 2003 was the first training of Lobo Bravo Rugby, the principle in the Plaza of Ukraine, which local, being public, has enough visibility of the sport practice.

In 2005 the Bravo Lobo Rugby became an association duly registered with the competent bodies.

Main Titles
Senior Male Team:
2011 - Rugby Championship of the state of Paraná - 2nd
2010 - Rugby Championship of the state of Paraná - 3rd
2009 - XV Ten-a-side del Mercosur CATARATAS (Puerto Iguazú, Argentina) - 6th
2009 - Rugby Championship of the state of Paraná - 3rd
2009 - Brazilian Rugby Sevens Circuit (Curitiba) - 6th
2008 - Rugby Championship of the state of Paraná - 2nd
2008 - Brazilian Rugby Sevens Circuit (Curitiba) - 6th
2008 - International Rugby Cup of Cascavel (rugby sevens) - 5th
2007 - Rugby Championship of the state of Paraná - 3rd
2007 - Brazilian Southern Rugby Championship - 4th
2006 - Rugby Championship of the state of Paraná - 3rd
2005 - Brazilian Rugby Sevens Circuit (Florianópolis) - 11th

Senior Female Team:
2006 - Brazilian Rugby Sevens Circuit (Florianópolis) - 5th

Junior Male Team:
2010 - Brazilian Rugby Sevens Circuit (Curitiba) - 6th
2006 - Rugby Sevens Cup of São Paulo Athletic Club - 5th

Uniform
After a period using the entirely blue marine shirts, currently the Rugby Lobo Bravo has two uniforms:

Uniform 1: black with red stripes and necks (two stripes on the sides and shoulders), black shorts, black socks. There is at the chest on the left, the shield of the team, in the colors of the flag of Guarapuava.
Uniforme 2: mostly blue with green side details, and two white stripes on the shoulders, white shorts, white socks. There is at the chest on the left, the shield of the team, in the colors of the flag of Guarapuava.

Training places
Currently Lobo Bravo Rugby hold their training every Saturday at the Quarter of the 26th Artillery Group of the Campaign. During the week, the drills are conducted in Lake Park.

External links
 Lobo Bravo Rugby's Blog
 Pictures
 Official page, under construction

Brazilian rugby union teams